The German White Book was a publication by the German government of 1914 documenting their claims for the causes of World War I. The full title was "The German White Book about the outbreak of the German-Russian-French war".{{efn|German title: "Das Deutsche Weißbuch über den Ausbruch des  deutsch-russisch-französischen Krieges}} An authorized English translation appeared in 1914. The book contained extracts of diplomatic material intended to portray the war's cause to other sources.

Other combatants in the war published similar books: The Blue Book of Britain, The Orange Book of Russia, and the Yellow Book of France.

The book comprised two sections:
 "How Russia and Her Ruler Betrayed Germany's Confidence and Thereby Caused the European War"
 "How the German-Franco Conflict Might have been Avoided"
and an Appendix with communications between Prince Lichnowsky and Sir Edward Grey.

In a report for the parliamentary investigative committee on the question of Germany's guilt in triggering World War I, Hermann Kantorowicz examined the White Book and reported that about 75 percent of the documents presented in it were falsified, with the goal of denying Germany's responsibility for the outbreak of World War I.

See also
 Centre for the Study of the Causes of the War
 Color books
 German entry into World War I
 Propaganda in World War I
 Causes of World War I

Works cited

 
 

References
Notes

Footnotes

Further reading

 
 
 
 
 
 Horne, John, and Alan Kramer. German atrocities, 1914: a history of denial (Yale University Press, 2001).
 Huebsch, B.W. The German Army in Belgium: The White Book of May 1915'' (1921).

External links
 Official translation in English

History books about World War I
German non-fiction books
Propaganda books and pamphlets
1914 non-fiction books
Government reports
Diplomatic correspondence